F.C. Tzeirei Tamra is an Israeli football club based in Tamra. The club was established in 2013, as a successor club, to Hapoel Bnei Tamra, which was dissolved in 2010.

History
The club was founded in the 2013 and joined Liga Gimel for the 2013–14 season and was placed in the Lower Galilee division. The club finished fifth in its first season and third in its second season.

In 2014–15 the club won the Lower Galilee division State Cup and progressed to the sixth round, where they were beaten by Maccabi Daliyat al Karmel. The club won the division cup the following season, as all other clubs in its division withdrew from the competition, and once again was beaten in the sixth round, this time by Hapoel Kafr Kanna.

Honours

Cups

References

Tamra
Association football clubs established in 2013
2013 establishments in Israel
Arab-Israeli football clubs